Adelphi (from Ancient Greek: ἀδελφός, adelphós, 'brother') may refer to:

Arts and entertainment
 Adelphi (band), an American rock band
 The Adelphi, an English literary journal 1923–1955
 Adelphi Papers, a monograph series of the International Institute for Strategic Studies
 Adelphi Records, a record label
 Adelphoe, or Adelphi – The Brothers, a play by Terence

Business, organisations and buildings

Hotels
Adelphi Hotel, Melbourne, Australia
Adelphi Hotel (Sheffield), England 
Britannia Adelphi Hotel, Liverpool, England

Universities
 Adelphi University, in Garden City, New York, U.S.
 Adelphi campus, of the University of Salford, England
 Adelphi commons, at Arizona State University, U.S.

Other businesses and organisations
Adelphi Edizioni, an Italian publishing house
Adelphi Films, a British film production company founded in 1939
Adelphi (Exeter College, Oxford), a wine club in Oxford
Adelphi Whisky, a whisky bottler and former distillery in Scotland

Other buildings
Adelphi Building, in Victoria, British Columbia, Canada
Adelphi Buildings, in London, England
Adelphi Cinema, in Dublin, Ireland
Adelphi Theatre, in London, England
Adelphi Theatre (New York City), U.S.
 Adelphi Theatre (Dublin), now Queen's Theatre, Dublin, in Ireland

Places
Adelphi, Iowa, an unincorporated community in Iowa, U.S.
Adelphi, Maryland, U.S.
Adelphi, Ohio, U.S.
Adelphi, Texas, U.S.
Adelphi, U.S. Virgin Islands
Adelphi, London, a district of the City of Westminster in London, England

Other uses
, a U.S. Navy ship 
Adelphi Canal, former canal in Derbyshire, England

See also

Adelphia (disambiguation)
Delphi (disambiguation)
Adelphi Charter of the Royal Society for the encouragement of Arts, Manufactures & Commerce in London, England